Raindance are British rave event organisers. They were one of the best known rave names on the rave scene in the late 1980s and early 1990s.

The start
The first event was held at a circus tent on 16 September 1989 at Jenkins Lane, Beckton in east London. This was Britain's first legal all night rave.

DJs such as Carl Cox, Dave Angel, LTJ Bukem, Mr C, DJ Rap, John Digweed, Kevin "Reece" Saunderson, Slipmatt, Fabio and Grooverider started out at Raindance. Live acts such as Shades of Rhythm, N-Joi and The Prodigy have all played at Raindance.

From 1989 to 1993, Raindance went on to hold large-scale events across Essex, Cambridgeshire, Leicestershire, Oxfordshire, Somerset and even Spain. The venues Raindance used held up to 10,000 ravers. DJ Slipmatt's brother, Paul Nelson, was one of the original promoters. The original idea to hold a rave came from Slipmatt himself.

But, by 1993, with pressure from the authorities (Criminal Justice and Public Order Act 1994) and the rave music scene splintering into different dance genres, Raindance took a break from holding mass events. Between 1993 and 1998 there were one-off events, then the promoters returned hosting regular indoor events in clubs around North and East London.

SE One
In 1999, Raindance started hosting raves at The Drome, an unused car park underneath London Bridge railway station. They would get regular attendances of over 2,000 people at this venue. In 2002, The Drome was renovated and seOne was born. Over the next eight years, SeOne would be Raindance's home and with a 3,000 capacity with seven different arenas (Jenkins Lane 89-90, Old Skool 91-93, Jungle/Drum & Bass 93-10, Hardcore 95-10, Hard House, Breakbeat, House & Trance). Raindance continues to put parties on all over the UK.

See also
List of electronic music festivals

References

External links
Raindance - Old Skool/Rave - Fantazia.org.uk
Raindance 1990 Part 7 Old Skool Rave - YouTube
Flyer for event at Wisbech - February 7 1992

Music festivals established in 1989
Dance organizations
Music promoters
Event management companies of the United Kingdom
Rave culture in the United Kingdom
Rave
Electronic music festivals in the United Kingdom
Electronic music event management companies